Impasse de la vignette or Un été après l'autre is a 1990 French-Belgian-Canadian comedy-drama film written and directed by Anne-Marie Etienne and starring Annie Cordy.

Plot
Thirty years of the life of a woman. Mother Fine lived impasse de la Vignette in Liège and lived years of grief and drama until her little girl comes to live at her side.

Cast

 Annie Cordy as Mother Fine
 Paul Crauchet as Pa
 Jean-Paul Comart as Francis
 Françoise Bette as Yvonne
 Monique Spaziani as Catherine
 Adrienne Bonnet as Liz
 Jo Rensonnet as Jo Carabin
 Jean-Yves Berteloot as Jeff
 Suzy Falk as Madame Lisa
 Dominique Baeyens as Louise
 Pieter Riemens as Emile
 Gaston Carême as Brother Carabin
 Yvette Merlin as Marutchka
 André Baeyens as Rouquin
 Pierre Laroche as Doctor Van Damme
 Günther Lesage as Arsene
 Olivia Capeta as Anne-Marie
 Fuencisla Carmona as Carmen
 Laurent Ancion as Tony
 Barbara Raskowski as Christiane
 Christophe Leleux as Polleke
 Raphael Bierlaire as Michel
 Armand Eloi as The Monk

Awards and recognitions
Annie Cordy received the Best Actress Prize to the Festivals de Digne et aux Antilles. The film received the Best First Film to the Festival de la Ciotat. In 2015, the film was screened to the "Festival du film francophone d'Angoulême" during a tribute to the Belgian cinema.

References

External links
 

1990 films
1990s crime comedy-drama films
1990s French-language films
French crime comedy-drama films
Canadian crime comedy-drama films
Belgian comedy-drama films
Quebec films
French-language Belgian films
French-language Canadian films
1990s Canadian films
1990s French films